The River House Mystery is a 1935 British film directed by Fraser Foulsham. The second film of Bernard Lee, it also stars G. H. Mulcaster, Ena Moon and A. B. Imeson.

References

External links

British mystery films
1935 films
British black-and-white films
1935 mystery films
1930s British films